Yehya Mohamed Hassanein  born 24 October 1949  is an Egyptian wrestler. He competed in the men's Greco-Roman 63 kg at the 1968 Summer Olympics.

References

External links
 

1944 births
Living people
Egyptian male sport wrestlers
Olympic wrestlers of Egypt
Wrestlers at the 1968 Summer Olympics
Sportspeople from Cairo
20th-century Egyptian people